Chris Payton-Jones (born August 13, 1995) is an American football cornerback for the Seattle Sea Dragons of the XFL. He played college football at Nebraska.

College career
Payton-Jones started 26 games for Nebraska over the course of three seasons. As a junior, he had three interceptions, 10 pass breakups and 37 tackles, including three for loss and one sack and was named All-Big Ten honorable mention. Payton-Jones missed the first half of his senior season due to a knee injury.

College statistics

Professional career

Detroit Lions
Payton-Jones signed with the Detroit Lions as an undrafted free agent on April 28, 2018. Payton-Jones failed to make the Lions' 53-man roster at the end of training camp and was waived by the team on September 1, 2018.

Arizona Cardinals
On September 3, 2018, Payton-Jones was signed to the Arizona Cardinals practice squad. Jones was promoted to the Cardinals' active roster on November 20, 2018. Payton-Jones made his NFL debut on November 25, 2018 against the Los Angeles Chargers. He was waived on November 27, 2018 and re-signed to the team's practice squad two days later. He was promoted to the active roster on December 18, 2018.

Payton-Jones made his first career start on September 22, 2019, against the Carolina Panthers. Payton-Jones was waived by the Cardinals on October 9, 2019 and re-signed to the practice squad. On November 8, 2019, Payton-Jones was promoted to the active roster.

On September 5, 2020, Payton-Jones was waived during the final roster cuts. He was re-signed to the practice squad a day later.

Detroit Lions (second stint)
On September 16, 2020, Payton-Jones was signed by the Detroit Lions off the Cardinals practice squad. He was waived on October 17. He was re-signed on October 21, but waived again on October 24.

Minnesota Vikings
Payton-Jones was claimed off waivers by the Minnesota Vikings on October 26, 2020.

Tennessee Titans
Payton-Jones signed with the Tennessee Titans on April 23, 2021. He was released on September 6, 2021 and re-signed to the practice squad. He was promoted to the active roster on November 10, 2021. He was waived on January 4, 2022 and re-signed to the practice squad.

Las Vegas Raiders
Payton-Jones signed as a free agent with the Las Vegas Raiders on June 13, 2022. He was released on August 23, 2022.

Seattle Sea Dragons 
On November 17, 2022, Payton-Jones was drafted by the Seattle Sea Dragons of the XFL.

References

External links 
 Las Vegas Raiders bio

1995 births
Living people
Sandalwood High School alumni
Players of American football from Jacksonville, Florida
American football cornerbacks
Nebraska Cornhuskers football players
Arizona Cardinals players
Detroit Lions players
Minnesota Vikings players
Tennessee Titans players
Las Vegas Raiders players
Seattle Sea Dragons players